40M may refer to:

 40-meter band, or 7-MHz band, an amateur radio frequency band
 40M Nimrod, a World War II Hungarian anti-aircraft tank
 40M Turán I, a Hungarian tank of World War II

See also 
 M40 (disambiguation)